Vera Vasilyevna Anisimova (born 25 May 1952 in Moscow) is a Soviet athlete who competed mainly in the 100 metres.

Anisimova trained at the Armed Forces sports society in Moscow. She competed for USSR in the 1976 Summer Olympics held in Montreal, Quebec, Canada in the 4 x 100 metres where she won the bronze medal with her teammates Tatyana Prorochenko, Lyudmila Maslakova and Nadezhda Besfamilnaya.

She returned for Soviet Union in the 1980 Summer Olympics held in Moscow, in the 4 x 100 metres where she again teamed up with Liudmila Zharkova-Maslakova where she won the silver medal with her teammates Vera Komisova, and Natalya Bochina.

External links
 

1952 births
Soviet female sprinters
Olympic silver medalists for the Soviet Union
Olympic bronze medalists for the Soviet Union
Athletes (track and field) at the 1976 Summer Olympics
Athletes (track and field) at the 1980 Summer Olympics
Olympic athletes of the Soviet Union
Living people
Armed Forces sports society athletes
Russian female sprinters
European Athletics Championships medalists
Athletes from Moscow
Medalists at the 1980 Summer Olympics
Medalists at the 1976 Summer Olympics
Olympic silver medalists in athletics (track and field)
Olympic bronze medalists in athletics (track and field)
Olympic female sprinters
Universiade medalists in athletics (track and field)
Universiade gold medalists for the Soviet Union